The Bush War may refer to:

 The Bush War (so-called “Guerre des Bois”) broke out in the year 1795 in St Lucia. 
The Rhodesian Bush War, a conflict in Rhodesia (now Zimbabwe) between the white minority government of Ian Smith and the black nationalists of the ZANU and ZAPU movements
The South African Border War, also known as the Angola Bush War or the Namibian War of Independence, a conflict from 1966 to 1989 in South-West Africa (now Namibia) and Angola
The Ugandan Bush War, a guerrilla war in Uganda waged by the National Resistance Army against the governments of Milton Obote and Tito Okello between 1981 and 1986
The Central African Republic Bush War, a war in the Central African Republic, between 2004 and 2007